The Veronicellidae, also known by their common name the leatherleaf slugs, are a family of pulmonate terrestrial slugs.

The herbivorous molluscs occur mainly in the tropical and subtropical areas of America, Asia and Africa.

They act as intermediate hosts of the rat lung worm Angiostrongylus costaricensis, and act as a vector for other human diseases.  They also cause significant damage to crops.

Description 
The dorsal surface of these slugs is entirely covered by the mantle or hyponota. These mollusks have a posterior located anus, eyes on contractile (not retractile) tentacles, and no lung or pulmonary organ. In these aspects they are anatomically distinct from most other types of terrestrial slugs, which typically belong to the order Stylommatophora, and which have a forward located anus, and retractile tentacles.

The closely related members of the family Onchidiidae differ from the Veronicellidae by having a pulmonary sac, or lung.

Distribution 
Members of the family can be found in the Central African Republic, Kenya, the Cameroon, tropical West Africa, Mexico, the Democratic Republic of the Congo, Thailand, southern Asia, southern China, Taiwan, Cuba, the Highland Rainforests of Puerto Rico, Florida, Dominica, Hawaii, the islands of the Indian Ocean, Australia, Samoa and Guyana.

Life cycle 
Some species of veronicellid bear live young.

Genera
The Veronicellidae family has no subfamilies (according to the taxonomy of the Gastropoda by Bouchet & Rocroi, 2005).

Genera within the family Veronicellidae include:
 Angustipes Colosi, 1922
 Belocaulus Hoffmann, 1925
 Colosius Thomé, 1975
 Diplosolenodes Thome, 1976
 Filicaulis Simroth, 1913
 Heterovaginina
 Imerinia Cockerell, 1891 
 Laevicaulis Simroth, 1913
 Latipes
 Leidyula H. B. Baker, 1925
 Phyllocaulis Colosi, 1922
 Potamojanuarius Thomé, 1975
 Sarasinula Grimpe & Hoffmann, 1924
 Sarasomia
 Simrothula Thomé, 1975
 Simrothula paraensis Gomes, Picanco, Mendes & Thome, 2006
 Vaginula Fischer, 1871
 Vaginula rodericensis Smith, 1876
 Vaginulus Férussac, 1829
 Veronicella de Blainville, 1817 - the type genus

References

External links 

 Video of Veronicellid slug of Laos
Slugs of Florida on the UF / IFAS Featured Creatures Web site

 
Taxa named by John Edward Gray